The Varunidae are a family of thoracotrematan crabs. The delimitation of this family, part of the taxonomically confusing Grapsoidea, is undergoing revision. For a long time, they were placed at the rank of subfamily in the Grapsidae, but they appear to be closest to Macropthalmus and the Mictyridae, which are usually placed in the Ocypodoidea. It may thus be better to merge the latter superfamily with the Grapsoidea, retaining the latter name as it is older.

That notwithstanding, the revision of the Grapsoidea (in the narrow but apparently still paraphyletic sense) is also not fully completed, as many taxa remain to be restudied. Already, several former Grapsidae genera have been moved to the Varunidae, and others are tentatively placed here pending detailed study. Among the most noteworthy of these is the Chinese mitten crab, Eriocheir sinensis. The genus Xenograpsus, formerly included in the Varunidae, is now placed in its own family, the Xenograpsidae.

The following genera are included:

Asthenognathinae Stimpson, 1858
Asthenognathus Stimpson, 1858
Globihexapus † Schweitzer & Feldmann, 2001
Cyclograpsinae H. Milne-Edwards, 1853
Austrohelice K. Sakai, Türkay & Yang, 2006
Chasmagnathus De Haan, 1833
Cyclograpsus H. Milne-Edwards, 1837
Helicana K. Sakai & Yatsuzuka, 1980
Helice De Haan, 1833
Helograpsus Campbell & Griffin, 1966
Metaplax H. Milne-Edwards, 1852
Miosesarma † Karasawa, 1989
Neohelice K. Sakai, Türkay & Yang, 2006
Paragrapsus H. Milne-Edwards, 1853
Parahelice K. Sakai, Türkay & Yang, 2006
Pseudohelice K. Sakai, Türkay & Yang, 2006
Gaeticinae Davie & N. K. Ng, 2007
Gaetice Gistel, 1848
Gopkittisak Naruse & P. F. Clark, 2009
Sestrostoma Davie & N. K. Ng, 2007
Thalassograpsinae Davie & N. K. Ng, 2007
Thalassograpsus Tweedie, 1950
Varuninae H. Milne-Edwards, 1853
Acmaeopleura Stimpson, 1858
Brachynotus De Haan, 1833
Cyrtograpsus Dana, 1851
Eriocheir De Haan, 1835
Grapsodius Holmes, 1900
Hemigrapsus Dana, 1851
Neoeriocheir T. Sakai, 1983
Noarograpsus N. K. Ng, Manuel & Ng, 2006
Orcovita Ng & Tomascik, 1994
Otognathon Ng & Stevcic, 1993
Parapyxidognathus Ward, 1941
Platyeriocheir N. K. Ng, J. Guo & Ng, 1999
Pseudogaetice Davie & N. K. Ng, 2007
Pseudograpsus H. Milne-Edwards, 1837
Ptychognathus Stimpson, 1858b
Pyxidognathus A. Milne-Edwards, 1879
Scutumara Ng & Nakasone, 1993
Tetragrapsus Rathbun, 1918
Utica White, 1847
Varuna Milne-Edwards, 1830

References

External links

Grapsoidea
Taxa named by Henri Milne-Edwards
Decapod families